Pretoro (locally Pretèure) is a town of about 1,100 inhabitants situated in Majella National Park, in the province of Chieti, Abruzzo, southern Italy.  It is located on a steep hillside on the eastern side of the Maiella mountains.  Its proximity to Passo Lanciano-La Majelletta ski area, guarantees the availability of winter sports, while the town is also only 20 minutes by car from the Adriatic Sea.

History
The area in which Pretoro is located has been occupied since prehistoric times; remains from that period have been found here, as well as inscriptions in Latin from the Roman era.  The first documented mention of the town is in a 12th-century record.  Pretoro's name may derive from the word "preta", an earlier form of the word "pietra" or stone.  The town stands on a rocky landscape that does not lend itself to farming.  Because the town is surrounded by beech-forest, the people of Pretoro have specialized over the centuries in woodcarving.

Main sights
Pretoro is composed of a cluster of stone buildings which climb the steep mountainside; the oldest part of the town is at the highest point, while down below is a newer section.

The 13th century Sanctuary of the Madonna della Mazza is located a little above the town.  This was a hermitage built by Benedictine and Cistercian monks from Santa Maria Arabona at Manoppello.  A work of art is the 16th century sculpture of the Pietà preserved in the church of San Nicola.

Within the town's territory is a nature preserve, the Riserva Naturale Valle del Foro.

People
Maria Pellegrini, operatic soprano

References

External links

Official website